Siamosuchus is a genus of goniopholidid mesoeucrocodylian. Its fossils have been recovered from the pre-Aptian-age Lower Cretaceous Sao Khua Formation of eastern Thailand.  It is known from a partial skull, most of the right half of the postcranial skeleton, and some bony scutes. Siamosuchus was described by Lauprasert and colleagues in 2007. The type species is S. phuphokensis.  Siamosuchus may be closely related to the European genus Goniopholis.

References

Fossil taxa described in 2007
Early Cretaceous crocodylomorphs of Asia
Neosuchians
Prehistoric pseudosuchian genera